Naltrindole is a highly potent, highly selective delta opioid receptor antagonist used in biomedical research. In May 2012 a paper was published in Nature with the structure of naltrindole in complex with the mouse δ-opioid G-protein coupled receptor, solved by X-ray crystallography.

Drug design
Since peptide compounds are unable to cross the blood–brain barrier, researchers developed naltrindole to be a non-peptide antagonist analog of the delta-preferring endogenous opiate enkephalin. Enkephalin contains an aromatic phenyl group on its Phe4 residue, which was hypothesized to be the "address" sequence responsible for the opiate's delta opioid receptor affinity. Thus, attachment of a phenyl-containing indole molecule to the C-ring of naltrexone's morphinan base successfully produced a drug with the high receptor affinity of naltrexone, but which binds almost exclusively to the delta opioid receptor.

References 

Delta-opioid receptor antagonists
4,5-Epoxymorphinans
Indolomorphinans
Phenols
Tertiary alcohols
Semisynthetic opioids